Buariki may refer to several places in Kiribati:

Buariki (Tarawa), an island in northern Tarawa Atoll and site of the World War II Battle of Buariki
Buariki, a village on Tarawa
Buariki (Tabiteuea), a settlement on Tabiteuea atoll
Buariki (Aranuka), the largest island in Aranuka Atoll
Buariki, a village on the Aranuka
Buariki (Kuria), the larger of the two Kuria islands
Buariki (Onotoa), the northernmost island in the Onotoa Atoll